Akshayapaathram is a 1977 Indian Malayalam film, directed by J. Sasikumar and produced by Sreekumaran Thampi. The film stars Prem Nazir, Kaviyoor Ponnamma, Adoor Bhasi and Lakshmi in the lead roles. The film has musical score by M. S. Viswanathan.

Cast
Prem Nazir
Kaviyoor Ponnamma
Adoor Bhasi
Lakshmi
Sreelatha Namboothiri
T. R. Omana
K. P. Ummer

Soundtrack
The music was composed by M. S. Viswanathan and the lyrics were written by Sreekumaran Thampi.

References

External links
 

1977 films
1970s Malayalam-language films
Films scored by M. S. Viswanathan
Films directed by J. Sasikumar